Vice Admiral Sir Nicholas John Hill-Norton,  (born 13 July 1939) is a retired senior Royal Navy officer who served as Deputy Chief of the Defence Staff (Commitments) from 1992 to 1995.

Early life and family
Born the son of Lieutenant Peter Hill-Norton (later Admiral of the Fleet Lord Hill-Norton) and Eileen Linstow on 13 July 1939, Hill-Norton was educated at Marlborough College and the Royal Naval College Dartmouth.

In 1966, Hill-Norton married Ann Jennifer Mason; they had two sons and one daughter.

Naval career
Hill-Norton joined the Royal Navy in 1957. He became commanding officer of the frigate  in 1974, commander of the Fishery Protection Squadron in 1978, commanding officer of the destroyer  in 1980 and commanding officer of the aircraft carrier  in 1983. He was appointed Director of Naval Staff Duties from April 1985 to June 1987. He went on to be Flag Officer Gibraltar in 1987, Flag Officer, Surface Flotilla and Commander Anti-Submarine Warfare Striking Force Atlantic in 1990 and Deputy Chief of the Defence Staff (Commitments) in 1992, before retiring in 1995.

Later life
In retirement, Hill-Norton became a defence advisor to GEC-Marconi and then to BAE Systems. In 2000, he replaced Sir John Foley as the Chairman of the British Greyhound Racing Board, a position he resigned in 2002.

References

1939 births
Knights Commander of the Order of the Bath
Living people
People educated at Marlborough College
Royal Navy vice admirals
People in greyhound racing
Sons of life peers